Jazz Impressions of Black Orpheus is the third album by American jazz pianist Vince Guaraldi (credited to the Vince Guaraldi Trio), released in 1962 on Fantasy Records. It is considered Guaraldi's breakthrough album and made him a household name.

The album contains both original compositions and covers of songs from the 1959 French/Brazilian film Black Orpheus which won an Academy Award for Best Foreign Film. It spawned the hit single "Cast Your Fate to the Wind", which won the 1963 Grammy Award for Best Original Jazz Composition. Some later pressings of the LP have the single's title displayed prominently at the top of the cover, and the album title in the box underneath. Consequently, this album is often referred to as Cast Your Fate to the Wind.

Jazz Impressions of Black Orpheus was released in 1983 in a half-speed mastered edition by Mobile Fidelity Sound Lab.

Another remastered version was released with five bonus tracks on Fantasy Records imprint, Original Jazz Classics label, on September 28, 2010. In addition, DCC Compact Classics issued the album on a Gold CD in 1993. A 60th anniversary remastered edition sourced from original master and analog tapes was released in CD and digital formats on November 18, 2022 by Craft Recordings.

Track listing

Original 1962 release

Original Jazz Classics CD remaster (2010)

60th Anniversary Deluxe reissue (2022)

Personnel
Vince Guaraldi Trio
Vince Guaraldi – piano
Colin Bailey – drums
Monty Budwig – double bass

Additional
Ray Fowler – engineer
Bernie Grundman – engineer (2022 remaster)
Ralph J. Gleason – liner notes
Derrick Bang – liner notes (2010, 2022 small batch 180-gram vinyl pressing)
Andrew Gilbert – liner notes (2022 remaster)

Release history

External links

References

Vince Guaraldi albums
1962 albums
Fantasy Records albums
Original Jazz Classics albums